K. N. Raghavan (born 30 May 1964) is a former Indian cricket umpire. He stood in one ODI game in 1998. He retired from umpiring in April 2013.

See also
 List of One Day International cricket umpires

References

1964 births
Living people
Indian One Day International cricket umpires
Place of birth missing (living people)